The New Zealand Industrial Exhibition was an industrial exhibition held in a large Industrial Exhibition Building in Wellington, between Lambton Quay and Stout Street in 1885. Organised by Julius Vogel it was intended to display New Zealand's industries to both encourage foreign investment and to boost New Zealand's self-confidence.

Opening
The exhibition was opened by William Jervois, (Governor-General of New Zealand) on 1 August 1885, with the Mayors of Auckland (William Waddel), Christchurch (Charles Hulbert) and Wellington (George Fisher) in attendance.

Buildings, exhibits and entertainment
As well as the main purpose built exhibition building exiting an existing drill hall was used as a concert hall with a borrowed organ from Jenkins of Christchurch.

And in St George's Hall refreshments were served on the ground floor, with its upper storey of St George's Hall being used for painting, drawing and photograph display. There were was a water colour competition, which was won by John Gully with his Western Coast of Tasman Bay.

References

External links
 Photograph of the Exhibition Building
 Newspaper cutting with much contemporary detail about the opening ceremony, and the main building construction

History of the Wellington Region
History of New Zealand
1885 in New Zealand
Culture in Wellington
Exhibitions in New Zealand
National exhibitions
1880s in Wellington
Events in Wellington